The 2012 Superbike World Championship was the twenty-fifth season of the Superbike World Championship. It began on 26 February at Phillip Island and ended on 7 October in Magny-Cours after 14 rounds.

The season saw the number of complete motorcycles in use limited to one per rider; this meant that the rules allowing bike changes during a race (flag-to-flag) were cancelled.

Aprilia rider Max Biaggi clinched his second SBK championship, pipping Kawasaki rider Tom Sykes by just half a point. Marco Melandri won more races than both Biaggi and Sykes this season but failing to score points in 5 of the last 6 races cost him the title.

Race calendar and results
The provisional race schedule was publicly announced by the FIM on 24 September 2011 with thirteen confirmed rounds and two other rounds pending confirmation. Russia appeared for the first time in the calendar with a round at the brand-new Moscow Raceway. The calendar was updated in October 2011 with the confirmation of the Imola round, for a total fourteen rounds. All races with the exception of Miller Motorsports Park – races held on Memorial Day Monday – were held on Sundays.

Footnotes

Championship standings

Riders' standings

Manufacturers' standings

 The second races at Monza and Silverstone were stopped early and half points were awarded.

Entry list
 A provisional entry list was released by the Fédération Internationale de Motocyclisme on 18 January 2012.

All entries used Pirelli tyres.

References

External links

 
Superbike World Championship seasons
World